is a railway station in Chūō-ku, Fukuoka, operated by the private railway operator Nishi-Nippon Railroad.

Lines 
Nishi-Nippon Railroad
Tenjin Ōmuta Line

Layout
The station is located on the second floor of the Solaria Terminal Building within the Mitsukoshi Building. It uses the Spanish solution with 3 dead-end lines. After the train arrives, the doors open on the middle platform to let the passengers out. After this, the doors on the opposite side will open and the waiting passengers can enter the train.

Platforms 
 Track 1 - Mainly used by express trains
 Track 2 - Mainly used by local trains
 Track 3 - Mainly used by limited express trains

With the biggest ticket gate, located on the second floor. Access to  department store via a concourse. There are two station offices, three coin locker rows, an ATM corner and an Internet corner. It is also the nearest exit gate for transfer to the Kūkō Line and Hakozaki Line on the Fukuoka City Subway.

West of the North Exit with access to the  Building.

Located on the first floor. There are coin lockers and a season ticket counter. Transfer to the Nishitetsu Tenjin Bus Center via elevator.

Located on the first floor, facing the road. There is a season ticket counter and it is the nearest exit gate for transfer to the Nanakuma Line on the Fukuoka City Subway.

Adjacent stations

History 
April 12, 1924 – the station opened.
Around 1935 – renamed .
September 22, 1942 – renamed .
November 1, 1961 – station moved to 2nd floor.
September 27, 1997 – improvement work was completed.
 September 1997 – Solaria Terminal Building was completed 80 m north of the former location (now Solaria Stage). Fukuoka Mitsukoshi department store entered as core tenant, competing with the nearby Iwataya Z-SIDE and Daimaru department stores. 
January 1, 2001 – renamed Nishitetsu Fukuoka (Tenjin) Station.

Passenger statistics
In fiscal 2006 the stations was used by an average of 140,340 passengers daily.

See also
 List of railway stations in Japan

Notes

Railway stations in Fukuoka Prefecture
Railway stations in Japan opened in 1924